Shivendra Singh Chauhan is a self-employed Indian journalist from the Indian city of Lucknow and co founder of India Against Corruption. He is currently the New Media Strategist at Reliance Industries.

References

1977 births
Living people
Indian male journalists